João Souza is the defending champion, but lost in the first round to Facundo Argüello.
Ivo Minář won the title by defeating Ricardo Hocevar 4–6, 6–1, 6–4 in the final.

Seeds

Draw

Finals

Top half

Bottom half

References
 Main Draw
 Qualifying Draw

Campeonato Internacional de Tenis de Santos - Singles
2012 Singles